Stephanie Ruhle Hubbard (born December 24, 1975) is the host of The 11th Hour and a Senior Business Analyst for NBC News. Previously, Ruhle was managing editor and news anchor for Bloomberg Television and editor-at-large for Bloomberg News. Ruhle co-hosted the Bloomberg Television show Bloomberg GO and was one of three Bloomberg reporters who broke the story of the London Whale, identifying the trader behind the 2012 JPMorgan Chase trading loss. She became the host of The 11th Hour in March 2022.

Early life
Her parents are Frank and Louise Ruhle, and she was raised in Park Ridge, New Jersey. She is a graduate of Lehigh University where she earned her bachelor’s degree in international business in 1997. As part of her major, she studied in Guatemala, Italy, and Kenya. Ruhle returned to Lehigh to give the 2017 commencement address.

Career 
Prior to joining Bloomberg, Ruhle spent 14 years working in the finance industry. While in college, she spent a summer interning for Merrill Lynch. In 1997, she joined Credit Suisse where she spent six years working in hedge fund sales. During her time at Credit Suisse First Boston, she served as a vice president and became the highest producing credit derivatives salesperson in the United States. In 2003, Ruhle joined Deutsche Bank as a credit salesperson covering hedge funds. She ended her eight-year career there as a managing director in Global Markets Senior Relationship Management. While at Deutsche Bank, Ruhle founded the Global Market Women's Network to help women move into leadership roles at the company.

Ruhle joined Bloomberg Television in October 2011, where she co-hosted a two-hour early morning program called Inside Track with co-anchor Erik Schatzker. In 2012, Ruhle and Schatzker joined Market Makers, a two-hour late morning program. Ruhle then co-hosted Bloomberg GO with David Westin before leaving the network. She has profiled figures including former New York City Mayor Michael Bloomberg, Goldman Sachs CEO Lloyd Blankfein, hedge fund managers Stanley Druckenmiller and David Tepper, NBA player Kobe Bryant, Donald Trump, chairman and CEO of JP Morgan Jamie Dimon, Martha Stewart, Sean Parker, former Vice President Al Gore, business magnate Russell Simmons, Masters winner Jordan Spieth, Miami Heat star Dwyane Wade, CEO and chair of Macy's Terry Lundgren, and music moguls Sean Combs and Kanye West.

In April 2012, Ruhle, along with Bloomberg reporters Bradley Keoun and Mary Childs, were the first reporters to break the story of the London Whale, the trader behind the 2012 JPMorgan Chase trading loss. Ruhle reported that Bruno Iksil, the London-based trader at JP Morgan, had amassed positions large enough to distort prices in the $10 trillion credit derivative market.

In June 2013, Ruhle wrote a provocative response to Paul Tudor Jones’ comments on women in trading for the Huffington Post that elicited responses from both the media and financial industries. In October of that same year, Ruhle sat down with Martha Stewart to discuss social media, blogging, and the creation of the "lifestyle" category.

In 2015, Ruhle produced and hosted Haiti: Open For Business? (2015), a documentary that explores Haiti’s emerging market five years after the country was hit by a devastating earthquake. Ruhle also appeared in Shark Land: A Mission Blue and Fusion Expedition (2015), which brings attention to the plight of sharks in Cocos Island, a national park off the shore of Costa Rica.

She interviewed in 2015 then-presidential candidate Donald Trump, who faced backlash in the media after noting to Ruhle that "the World Trade Center came down during [former President George W. Bush’s] reign." The previous year, rapper Kanye West strongly criticized photographer Annie Leibovitz during a panel conversation with Ruhle when he revealed that Leibovitz pulled out of taking his official wedding pictures just one day before his wedding to Kim Kardashian. Ruhle’s interview with Martha Stewart in 2013 brought an ongoing feud between Stewart and Gwyneth Paltrow public after Stewart questioned the actress’s place in the "lifestyle business".

Ruhle was a columnist for Shape.com, the website for Shape magazine. Ruhle was featured on the cover of Working Mother magazine in October 2012, as well as Fit Pregnancy on their April/May 2013 issue. She has been profiled by 201 Magazine, Glass Hammer, IWantHerJob, and Business Insider.

No longer with Bloomberg, Ruhle would become host of an hour of MSNBC Reports after having co-hosted, with Ali Velshi, a business program Velshi & Ruhle, which aired weekdays and Saturday.

Ruhle founded the Corporate Investment Bank (CIB) Women's Network and co-chaired the Women on Wall Street (WOWS) steering committee. Ruhle is also a member of the board of trustees for Girls, Inc. New York and a former member of the iMentor Corporate Advisory Board. She is a member of 100 Women in Hedge Funds, The Women's Bond Club and a member of the corporate council of The White House Project, a not-for-profit organization working to advance women in business, government, and media. She also serves on the board and advises for React To Film, an issue-based documentary film series.

On January 27, 2022, she was named new permanent anchor of The 11th Hour after serving as one of several rotating hosts following original anchor Brian Williams's departure from the network in December.

Personal life 
Ruhle resides in Manhattan with her husband and three children. She is Catholic.

See also 
 New Yorkers in journalism

References

External links

1975 births
Living people
20th-century Roman Catholics
21st-century Roman Catholics
American women television journalists
Bloomberg L.P. people
Catholics from New Jersey
Lehigh University alumni
MSNBC people
NBC News people
People from Park Ridge, New Jersey
Managing editors